These are tables of congressional delegations from New Jersey to the United States Senate and United States House of Representatives.

The current dean of the New Jersey delegation is Representative Chris Smith (NJ-4), having served in the House since 1981.

United States Senate

United States House of Representatives

Current members

Historical members

1789–1843

1843–1873

1873–1903

1903–1913

1913–1933

1933–1983

1983–1993

1993–present

Key

See also

List of United States congressional districts
New Jersey's congressional districts
Political party strength in New Jersey

Notes

References 

Sources

 Congressional Biographical Directory of the United States 1774–present
 Information from the Clerk of the U.S. House of Representatives

Politics of New Jersey
New Jersey
Members of the United States House of Representatives from New Jersey
 
Congressional delegations